Helen Phillips Levin (March 26, 1924 – January 6, 1985) was an American social worker and disability rights activist based in Los Angeles.

Early life and education 
Helen Adele Phillips was born in Minneapolis, Minnesota, the daughter of Jay Phillips and Rose Ebin Phillips. Her parents were Russian Jewish immigrants. She completed a Master of Social Work (MSW) degree at the University of Southern California in 1981.

Career 
Levin worked at a suicide prevention hotline in Los Angeles, and read books for blind students. She was a major early benefactor of the Westside Center for Independent Living (WCIL), and served on its board. She also served on the architectural barriers committee of the Los Angeles City Council for the Handicapped.

Personal life and legacy 
Helen Phillips married Jack I. Levin in 1941. They had two sons, Thomas and John. She survived polio in 1951, when her sons were young; she spent almost a year in an iron lung during her recovery, and used a wheelchair. She died in 1985, at her home in Bel Air.

Her family established several scholarships in her name, including the  Helen Phillips Levin/Hebrew Union College Scholarship, and the Helen Phillips Levin Dean's Leadership Scholarship at the University of Southern California's School of Social Work. In 1983, the WCIL, now known as the Disability Community Resource Center, named its building the Phillips Levin Building, for Helen Phillips Levin.

References

External links 
 

1924 births
1985 deaths
American social workers
People from Minneapolis
Wheelchair users
People with polio
University of Southern California alumni